Enden is a neighborhood of Ringebu municipality, Innlandet county, Norway. It is located where County Road 27 branches off from E6.

References

Villages in Oppland
Villages in Innlandet
Ringebu